Flaked is an American comedy drama streaming television series created by Will Arnett and Mark Chappell. It stars Arnett as Chip, a self-appointed "guru" who falls in love. The first season consisted of eight episodes and was released on Netflix on March 11, 2016. In July 2016, the series was renewed for a six-episode second season, which premiered on June 2, 2017.

Upon release, Flaked received mixed reviews. Mary McNamara from the Los Angeles Times described Flaked as "another exasperating exploration of stunted white male adulthood." The second season was more well received. IGN found that it "proves to be a stronger, more focused series in its second season, even if it doesn't improve on all the faults of the first."

Cast

Main
Will Arnett as Chip
David Sullivan as Dennis
Ruth Kearney as London/Claire 
George Basil as "Cooler"/John

Recurring
Lina Esco as Kara
Dennis Gubbins as That Fucking Guy 
Christopher Mintz-Plasse as Topher
Mike Cochrane as a tattoo artist 
Jeff Daniel Phillips as Uno
Kirstie Alley as Jackie 
Heather Graham as Tilly 
Seana Kofoed as Vanessa Weiss
Annika Marks as Brooke
Jessica Lowe as Widow
Annabeth Gish as Alicia Wiener
Robert Wisdom as George Flack
Travis Mills as Stefan
Mark Boone Junior as Jerry
Frankie Shaw as Natasha
Jim Turner as Chairperson
Elisabeth Röhm as Alex
Shawn Hatosy as Karel
Lenora Crichlow as Rosa

Episodes

Series overview

Season 1 (2016)

Season 2 (2017)

Reception
The first season received mixed reviews from critics. On Rotten Tomatoes, the season has an approval rating of 35% based on 31 reviews, with an average rating of 5.12/10. The site's critical consensus reads: "Dull and pointless, Flaked makes it uncomfortably clear that the man-child persona is no longer compelling." On Metacritic, the season has a weighted average score of 43 out of 100, based on 16 critics, indicating "mixed or average reviews".

The show was criticized by Emily VanDerWerff of Vox for "stupid plot twists" and devolving into melodrama.

References

External links

2010s American comedy-drama television series
2016 American television series debuts
2017 American television series endings
English-language Netflix original programming
Television shows set in California